The 1940 Norwegian Football Cup was the 39th season of the Norwegian annual knockout football tournament. This was the last cup until the end of Second World War, due to a sports strike against competition organized by Vidkun Quisling. The tournament was open for all members of NFF, except those from Northern Norway. The final was played at Ullevaal Stadion in Oslo on 13 October 1940, and was contested by the last year's losing finalist Skeid and the four-time former winners Fredrikstad. Fredrikstad secured their fifth title with a 3-0 win in the final. Sarpsborg were the defending champions, but were eliminated by Fredrikstad in the semifinal.

Rounds and dates
 First round: 4 August
 Second round: 18. August
 Third round: 1 September
 Fourth round: 8 September
 Quarter-finals: 22 September
 Semi-finals: 6 October
 Final: 13 October

First round

|-
|colspan="3" style="background-color:#97DEFF"|Replay

|}

Second round

|}

Third round

|}

Fourth round

|}

Quarter-finals

|-
|colspan="3" style="background-color:#97DEFF"|Replay

|}

Semi-finals

|}

Final

See also
1939–40 League of Norway
1940 in Norwegian football

References

Norwegian Football Cup seasons
Norway
Cup